Aaron Cann (born October 23, 1991) is an American football guard who is a free agent. He played college football at South Carolina, and was selected in the third round of the 2015 NFL Draft by the Jacksonville Jaguars.

Early years
Cann attended Bamberg-Ehrhardt High School in Bamberg, South Carolina, where he played football and competed in track. He committed to play college football at the University of South Carolina in June 2009.

Cann's mother died of throat cancer on October 7, 2007.

College career
Cann was redshirted as a freshman in 2010. In 2011, he became a starter at left guard. In 2013, he was named a permanent team captain. Cann had started 38 of 39 games entering his senior season. As a senior in 2014, he started all 13 games and was named an All-American.

Cann was a four-year starter, starting in 51 games, the second-most in school history to T. J. Johnson who started 53 games.

Professional career

Jacksonville Jaguars
Cann was drafted by the Jacksonville Jaguars in the third round, 67th overall, in the 2015 NFL Draft.

During his rookie season in 2015, Cann started 13 games at right guard while playing a total of 14 games.

In 2016, Cann saw a full-time role on the offensive line, starting all 16 games at the right guard position for the Jaguars.

Cann maintained his starting job at right guard in 2017 and 2018, starting 15 games both seasons, missing one each season, both due to a triceps injury.

On March 13, 2019, Cann signed a three-year, $15 million contract extension with the Jaguars.

On October 4, 2021, Cann was placed on injured reserve.

Houston Texans
On March 23, 2022, Cann signed a two-year, $8.5 million contract with the Houston Texans. He was named the Texans starting right guard, and started 16 games.

Cann was released on March 16, 2023.

References

External links

South Carolina Gamecocks bio
Jacksonville Jaguars bio

1991 births
Living people
People from Bamberg, South Carolina
Players of American football from South Carolina
American football offensive guards
South Carolina Gamecocks football players
Jacksonville Jaguars players
Houston Texans players